Andrea Dakó (born 12 August 1972) is a Hungarian badminton player, born in Budapest. She competed in women's singles and women's doubles at the 1992 Summer Olympics in Barcelona.

References

External links

1972 births
Living people
Sportspeople from Budapest
Hungarian female badminton players
Olympic badminton players of Hungary
Badminton players at the 1992 Summer Olympics
20th-century Hungarian women
21st-century Hungarian women